Leonid Valerievich Volkov (October 15, 1988) is a Russian sportsman, Indoor Skydiving World Champion in Freestyle.

Biography 

Leonid Volkov was born on October 15, 1988 in Leningrad. From 1995 to 2002 he studied at school, and then from 2002 to 2005 he enrolled at Nakhimov Naval School. In 2005 Leonid entered Military Engineering-Technical University, which he graduated from in 2010. After his graduation from the University, he was allocated to Kaliningrad to serve in the Baltic Fleet. After some time he resigned at his own will to the reserve and returned to St. Petersburg.

In 2012 Leonid started to practice parachute jumping, after which he was hired as an instructor by the first professional indoor skydiving school in St. Petersburg, FlyStation, where he taught people to manage their own bodies in the airflow. After six months of training, Leonid Volkov won an indoor skydiving competition in St. Petersburg and was admitted to the FlyStation sports team in vertical and dynamic group acrobatics in the airflow. After two years of performances as a part of the team, he turned to single freestyle skydiving.

Since 2015, Leonid Volkov has been working on the project TunnelSport.com, where he publishes information about the flight of the body in the airflow.

In 2016, Spain hosted the world's first international musical freestyle competition in indoor skydiving (dancing in the aero tube) called Wind Games, according to the rules of which it was mandatory to use music during the performance (until that all athletes had been skydiving without music), where Leonid Volkov took first place. There were three combined tracks in the performance of the Russian sportsman: a waltz from the movie "A Hunting Accident", the soundtrack "Clubbed to death" from "The Matrix" and "Lux Aeterna" from the movie "Requiem for a Dream".

In 2017, Leonid Volkov acquired a title of Indoor Skydiving World Champion in Freestyle, having won the World Indoor Skydiving Championship, held in Canada, with 2 points ahead of his opponents.

Achievements

References

External links
 How a would-be pilot became the world's best indoor sky dancer
 Leonid Volkov: The Nureyev of Indoor Skydiving
 Competitive indoor skydiving is real — and it's insane to watch

1988 births
Living people
Russian skydivers